Bobby McGrath is an American professional pool player from Washington, Illinois, nicknamed "the Kid" for being one of the youngest professional pool players.

He won US$50,000 in the 2007 International Speed Pool Challenge, not only beating the UK's Dave Pearson (a long-time top ranking speed pool pro and holder of several world records), in the final, but also knocking out defending 2006 champion Luc Salvas of Canada, in the semi-finals. In 2008, McGrath met Pearson again at the finals of the same tournament where he won it for the second time in a row.

Having competed professionally for several years, he was pressured to compete by his many admirers to make the SpeedPooL event a success earlier in 2007 in the amateur VNEA Speed Pool Championship, which he won.

References

American pool players
Living people
Year of birth missing (living people)
Place of birth missing (living people)
People from Washington, Illinois